Rhyne Howard (born April 29, 2000) is an American professional basketball player for the Atlanta Dream of the Women's National Basketball Association (WNBA). She played college basketball for the Kentucky Wildcats. She graduated from Bradley Central High School located in Cleveland, Tennessee in 2018. She was drafted first overall by the Dream in the 2022 WNBA draft.

In her senior year of high school at Bradley Central located in Tennessee, she was named 2018 Tennessee Gatorade Player of the Year and Tennessee Miss Basketball. Howard participated on the USA team in 2018 and 2019, leading them to a gold medal and was awarded MVP honors in 2018. She participated in the Jordan Brand Classic among the top rated recruits in the U.S. Following her freshman season at Kentucky, Howard was named USBWA National Freshman of the Year.  In 2020 and 2021, she was named SEC Player of the Year.

College career
Howard notched SEC player of the year in 2020 and 2021, her sophomore and junior years at UK. She also earned All-SEC defensive team and All-SEC first team honors in 2021. In her freshman year, she earned the honors of All-SEC first team and SEC freshman of the year. Entering the Wildcats' 2021 postseason, Howard is the only player in the nation averaging 19 points per game and 7.5 rebounds per game, while snatching 40 steals and 70 assists.

On January 27, 2022, Howard scored her 2,000th point in her college career, becoming the third Wildcat to reach that benchmark.

Career statistics

College

|-
| style="text-align:left;" | 2018–19
| style="text-align:left;" | Kentucky
| 32 || 31 || 30.9 || .445 || .387 || .676 || 5.1 || 2.3 || 2.1 || 0.7 || 2.4 || 16.4
|-
| style="text-align:left;" | 2019–20
| style="text-align:left;" | Kentucky
| 27 || 27 || 31.2 || .433 || .382 || .791 || 6.5 || 2.4 || 2.3 || 1.1 || 2.2 || 23.4
|-
| style="text-align:left;" | 2020–21
| style="text-align:left;" | Kentucky
| 24 || 24 || 34.8 || .444 || .373 || .779 || 7.3 || 3.8 || 2.5 || 0.8 || 2.1 || 20.7
|-
| style="text-align:left;" | 2021–22
| style="text-align:left;" | Kentucky
| 31 || 31 || 35.3 || .441 || .383 || .808 || 7.4 || 3.3 || 2.3 || 1.3 || 1.8 || 20.5
|-
| style="text-align:center;" colspan=2 | Career
| 114 || 113 || 33.0 || .440 || .382 || .772 || 6.9 || 2.9 || 2.3 || 1.0 || 2.2 || 20.1

Professional career
On April 11, 2022, Howard was drafted first overall by the Atlanta Dream in the 2022 WNBA draft. During her rookie year Rhyne started every game and averaged 16.8 points,2.8 assist,and 1.6 steals.Howard was announced to her first All-star game in July. She went on to earn Rookie of the month honors every month from May to August. Howard would later be announced as  the WNBA Rookie of the Year for 2022.

WNBA career statistics

Regular season

|-
| align="left" | 2022
| align="left" | Atlanta
| 34 || 34 || 31.4 || .361 || .343 || .792 || 4.5 || 2.8 || 1.6 || 0.8 || 1.5 || 16.2
|-
| align="left" | Career
| align="left" | 1 year, 1 team
| 34 || 34 || 31.4 || .361 || .343 || .792 || 4.5 || 2.8 || 1.6 || 0.8 || 1.5 || 16.2

Personal life
Howard is a member of Zeta Phi Beta sorority She was initiated through the Iota Mu chapter at the University of Kentucky. She has a girlfriend.

References

External links
Kentucky Wildcats bio

2000 births
Living people
All-American college women's basketball players
Atlanta Dream draft picks
Atlanta Dream players
American women's basketball players
Basketball players from Tennessee
Kentucky Wildcats women's basketball players
McDonald's High School All-Americans
People from Cleveland, Tennessee
Shooting guards
Sportspeople from Chattanooga, Tennessee
United States women's national basketball team players
Women's National Basketball Association All-Stars
Women's National Basketball Association first-overall draft picks